Chrystul Kizer was arrested at age 17 for the murder of Randall Phillip Volar III. During her arrest, she claimed Volar was her sex trafficker. On June 5, 2018, she shot him twice while he was sitting in a chair, set his house on fire, then stole his car. Kizer was arrested and incarcerated at Kenosha County Detention Facility to await trial. Kenosha County prosecutors charged her with first degree intentional homicide using a dangerous weapon, and four other felonies. They contend the murder was premeditated. If convicted, she would face a mandatory life sentence in prison.

Kizer's lawyer claims she was a child trafficking victim acting in self-defense against her sex trafficker. Her case received renewed notoriety in December 2019 after The Washington Post interviewed her, and after the George Floyd protests. Community activists posted her $400,000 bond, and she was released in June 2020. A trial date is not set. Renewed interest in her case followed the Kyle Rittenhouse case (which also took place in Kenosha) where the defense claimed self-defense and the jury delivered a not guilty verdict.

Background and incident 
Kenosha, Wisconsin resident Chrystul Kizer met Randall "Randy" Volar III, a 34-year-old white man, on Backpage when she was 16. She posted to the site after a referral from a girl she knew, and stated that she needed the money for food and school notebooks. He was the first person to contact her when she joined the site. She lived with him and alleged that he sexually abused her regularly and sometimes filmed the abuse for over a year. Kizer alleged that he began trafficking her using Backpage and took the money she was paid.

Volar was previously arrested in 2017 after a 15-year-old girl reported him to police for giving her drugs and threatening to kill her. He was charged with child enticement, using a computer to facilitate a child sex crime, and second-degree sexual assault of a child. Volar was released the same day and had to pay no bail, and was told he would receive a court summons. The Washington Post reported that court records demonstrated that police had evidence that Volar was abusing multiple underage African-American girls and there was video evidence of the abuse. Records also showed that the prosecutor's office received the evidence 12 days before Volar was killed and three months after his arrest.

Prosecutors allege that Kizer killed Volar on June 5, 2018, by shooting him in the head. Charging documents say Kizer admitted to taking an Uber from Milwaukee to Volar's residence, shooting him because "she had gotten upset and she was tired of [him] touching her", and then starting a fire at the residence before departing in Volar's BMW. A neighbor called 9-1-1 to report the fire at Volar's house. Police found and identified his burned body, and a later autopsy showed he had been shot in the head. Volar's car was found abandoned in Milwaukee. Police used a receipt found in the car, surveillance video, and Facebook to track the stolen car to Kizer by matching an arrest photo to her selfies and live video. Prosecutors allege Kizer also stole a laptop and cash from Volar. Kizer initially denied knowing Volar or traveling to Kenosha, but later affirmed those facts.

Aftermath 
Kizer was incarcerated at the Kenosha County Detention Facility and bail was set at $1 million. Kenosha County charged her with first-degree intentional homicide, which carries a mandatory life sentence in prison according to Wisconsin law. Lead prosecutor and District Attorney Michael Graveley alleged that the murder was premeditated. The prosecution agreed that Volar was an abuser, but further stated that Kizer planned to steal Volar's car as indicated by being armed with the gun, and that she downloaded a police scanner app the day of the shooting.

In her first press interview to The Washington Post in December 2019, Kizer disputed her initial police statement and said she had killed Volar in self-defense because he had her pinned down and was attempting to sexually assault her. Her lawyers planned to argue an affirmative defense, a Wisconsin state law that allows one to be acquitted of all charges if a crime was committed by someone being trafficked. There are no known cases where the affirmative defense has been used in an offense involving a violent crime. In December 2019, Kenosha County Circuit Court Judge David Wilk ruled that "Chrystul did not have access to the affirmative defense law for trafficking victims."

Media attention and activism 
Kizer's case received national attention after Jessica Contrera of The Washington Post covered the story in December 2019. Alyssa Milano and Tarana Burke were among those who circulated information about the case on social media. Critics of Kizer's arrest argued that the criminal justice system frequently punishes trafficking victims such as Kizer. Sex crimes expert Rachel Monaco-Wilcox stated that children of color are seen as willing participants in trafficking cases.

Supporters wrote letters to Kizer. Cyntoia Brown-Long wrote an op-ed that outlined the similarities between their cases. A petition with approximately 950,000 signatures circulated that requested Kizer's release and the case's dismissal in December 2019. DA Graveley posted a Facebook response that stated that he would not be swayed by the petition.

Kizer's mother, Devore Taylor, formed the Chrystul Kizer Defense Committee to organize around the case and to raise bail money. The case received renewed attention again after the George Floyd protests, and organizations such as Chicago Community Bond Fund received an influx of donations.

Ongoing case 
A trial date has not been set. In February 2020, Judge Wilk lowered the bond amount to $400,000.

At a June 2020 hearing, Kizer's public defenders stated that she had contracted COVID-19 while incarcerated and argued that she should be released to receive medical attention. The motion was denied.

Kizer was released on June 22, 2020 after she posted bond raised by the Chicago Community Bond Fund, the Milwaukee Freedom Fund, Survived and Punished, and the Chrystul Kizer Defense Committee.

On June 2, 2021, the Wisconsin Court of Appeals released a published decision, finding that the trial court had erred when denying her the ability to raise, as an affirmative defense, WIS. STAT. § 939.46(1m), related to victims of human trafficking and child sex trafficking.  This decision was upheld by the Wisconsin state Supreme Court in July 2022.

See also 
 Marissa Alexander case
 Adultification bias
 Battered woman syndrome
 Abuse defense

References

External links 
 Defense committee—Official website 
 ABC 30—Video: "Wisconsin teen faces life in prison for killing alleged sex trafficker"

Child sexual abuse in the United States
Sex trafficking
2018 in Wisconsin
Victims of underage prostitution
Incidents of violence against girls
Vigilantism against sex offenders
Defensive gun use